Willy Matheisl  (born 1950) in Ingolstadt, Bavaria, Germany was educated in photography in the city of Zuerich, Switzerland, Europe. He was travelling the world for decades as a freelance travel photographer photographing for stock agencies and publishers. Landscape photography was very important to him and so it is no wonder that he worked with the legendary Linhof Panorama camera 6x17 using medium format roll film 6x6.

He is a photographer living in Deggendorf, Bavaria, Germany since 1985.  He is the creator of a famous photo of a tree through the four seasons. The image has been used on calendars, on book covers and school books. (see external link below).

External links
SZ-photo (Sueddeutsche Zeitung Photo) has more views of this tree, as well as the famous composing,  photographed by Willy Matheisl

Süddeutsche Zeitung - Photos

1950 births
Living people
Photographers from Bavaria
People from Deggendorf

GettyImages, USA, some of Willy Matheisl most popular photos